The 1898 Dickinson football team was an American football team that represented Dickinson College as an independent during the 1898 college football season. The team compiled an 8–1 record and outscored opponents by a total of 211 to 86. Nathan Stauffer was the team's head coach, and A. M. Devall was the captain.

Andrew Kerr, later inducted into the College Football Hall of Fame, was a student at Dickinson at the time but did not play for the varsity football team.

Schedule

Players
The following players were starters on the 1898 team:
 O. N. Diehl - center
 W. H. Decker - right guard
 G. H. Bonner - left guard
 A. M. Devall - captain, right tackle
 Fred Bindenberger - left tackle
 Forrest Craver - right end
 S. F. Shiffer - left end
 George Williams - left end
 D. N. Houston - quarterback
 E. F. Hann - right halfback
 C. H. Clippinger - left halfback
 R. N. Hockenberry - fullback

References

Dickinson
Dickinson Red Devils football seasons
Dickinson football